Panzós is a town, with a population of 22,068 (2018 census), and a municipality in the Guatemalan department of Alta Verapaz.

On 29 May 1978, the village of Panzós was the site of a massacre in which between 30 and 106 local inhabitants (figures vary) were killed by the army.

The name Panzós means "place of the green waters", in reference to the nearby Polochic River and swamps full of alligators and birds.

History 

The Polochic river valley was originally inhabited by Q'eqchi' and Poqomchi' peoples. The first Spanish settlement, according to Domingo Juárez, was founded there on 11 October 1825;  however, other historians specify 11 October 1861 as its foundation date. Later on, government decree #38 of 1871, in which all Guatemalan municipalities were asked to elect representatives to the National Assembly shows Panzós a town in District 35.  In 1891, Panzós became part of Alta Verapaz Department for good.

After the Liberal revolution of 1871, president Justo Rufino Barrios (1873-1885) started granting land to German settlers in the area.  By Decree #170 (or Census Decree) the government allowed  confiscation of Indigenous land that had remained protected until then, to make it easier for the Germans and liberal military officers to get land of their own.  Since then, the main commercial and agricultural activity in the region has been coffee, cardamom and bananas. Thus, the main characteristics of the productive system of those years was the accumulation of land by a few owners, and a sort of "hacienda servitude", based on the legal exploitation of the natives.

In the 1880s, Panzós had become a very important commercial river port, heavily used for coffee exports the finished product was carried by oxen carts over poorly kept roads, or on small boats through creeks to the port, and from there it was loaded into larger ships and sent to the Caribbean Sea and then on to Europe or other destinations.  This archaic system changed drastically in the 1890s, once the Verapaz Railroad was built.

Verapaz Railroad

The Verapaz Railroad began on 15 January 1894 with a contract for 99 years between Guatemala -then ruled by president José María Reina Barrios- and Walter Dauch, representative of the Verapaz Railroad & Northern Agency Ltd. The contract settled the rules for the construction, maintenance and exploitation of a 30-mile railroad line between Panzós and Pancajché. Passenger service travelled twice a week, on Mondays and Thursdays;  besides, mail arrived by ship every Wednesday and cargo came from Livingston, Izabal. Besides, there were train stops in Santa Rosita, Santa Catalina La Tinta, and Papalhá.

In 1898, it was reported that given the coffee prosperity in Cobán, which in those days was the third largest city in Guatemala, the railroad was going to be extended to that city.  The railroad was in operation until 1965, when it was superseded by truck and highways.

Franja Transversal del Norte and Panzós massacre 

The Northern Transversal Strip was officially created during the government of General Carlos Arana Osorio in 1970, by Legislative Decree 60-70, for agricultural development. The decree stated: "It is of public interest and national emergency, the establishment of Agrarian Development Zones in the area included within the municipalities: Santa Ana Huista, San Antonio Huista, Nentón, Jacaltenango, San Mateo Ixtatán, and Santa Cruz Barillas in Huehuetenango; Chajul and San Miguel Uspantán in Quiché; Cobán, Chisec, San Pedro Carchá, Lanquín, Senahú, Cahabón and Chahal, in Alta Verapaz and the entire department of Izabal."

On 27 May 1978, when natives from San Vicente (in Panzós) went to work the land on the shores of the Polochic river, the sons of a local landlord showed up with several armed soldiers, and intimidated the natives to stop demanding land for themselves. The same day, the military detained two peasants in La Soledad, and roughed up several more. There was a small disturbance and one of the peasants was killed.

On 28 May, peasants from La Soledad and Cahaboncito presented a document previously prepared by FASGUA to mayor Walter Overdick Garcia, in order for him to read it out loud. In that document, FASGUA asked the mayor to mediate "for the peasants' sake and try to solve the problems they had".

On 29 May 1978, to pressure the authorities for their land demands and to protest against the abuses of landlords and military and civil authorities, peasants from the settlements of Cahaboncito, Semococh, Rubetzul, Canguachá, Sepacay, Moyagua and La Soledad, decided to protest in downtown Panzós. Hundreds of native men, women and children went to the central square, bringing along their machetes and other agricultural instruments.  One of those who participated in the demonstration later recalled: "the idea was not to fight anybody, we only wanted to clarify the land situation.  People came from various locations and they did not have firearms with them".   That same day, after an unclear provation, the army massacred the peasants who had gathered peacefully. An unclear number of people died under the fire of machine guns.

Climate

Panzós has a tropical monsoon climate (Köppen: Am).

Geographic location

See also 

 Alta Verapaz Department
 Guatemala Civil War
 Franja Transversal del Norte
 Kjell Eugenio Laugerud García

Notes and references

Notes

References

Bibliography 

 
 
 
 
 
 
 
 
 
 
 
 
 
 
 
 
 

Municipalities of the Alta Verapaz Department